In queueing theory, a discipline within the mathematical theory of probability, a Jackson network (sometimes Jacksonian network) is a class of queueing network where the equilibrium distribution is particularly simple to compute as the network has a product-form solution. It was the first significant development in the theory of networks of queues, and generalising and applying the ideas of the theorem to search for similar product-form solutions in other networks has been the subject of much research, including ideas used in the development of the Internet. The networks were first identified by James R. Jackson and his paper was re-printed in the journal Management Science’s ‘Ten Most Influential Titles of Management Sciences First Fifty Years.’

Jackson was inspired by the work of Burke and Reich, though Jean Walrand notes "product-form results … [are] a much less immediate result of the output theorem than Jackson himself appeared to believe in his fundamental paper".

An earlier product-form solution was found by R. R. P. Jackson for tandem queues (a finite chain of queues where each customer must visit each queue in order) and cyclic networks (a loop of queues where each customer must visit each queue in order).

A Jackson network consists of a number of nodes, where each node represents a queue in which the service rate can be both node-dependent (different nodes have different service rates) and state-dependent (service rates change depending on queue lengths). Jobs travel among the nodes following a fixed routing matrix. All jobs at each node belong to a single "class" and jobs follow the same service-time distribution and the same routing mechanism. Consequently, there is no notion of priority in serving the jobs: all jobs at each node are served on a first-come, first-served basis.

Jackson networks where a finite population of jobs travel around a closed network also have a product-form solution described by the Gordon–Newell theorem.

Necessary conditions for a Jackson network

A network of m interconnected queues is known as a Jackson network or Jacksonian network if it meets the following conditions:

 if the network is open, any external arrivals to node i form a Poisson process,
 All service times are exponentially distributed and the service discipline at all queues is first-come, first-served,
 a customer completing service at queue i will either move to some new queue j with probability  or leave the system with probability , which, for an open network, is non-zero for some subset of the queues,
 the utilization of all of the queues is less than one.

Theorem

In an open Jackson network of m M/M/1 queues where the utilization  is less than 1 at every queue, the equilibrium state probability distribution exists and for state  is given by the product of the individual queue equilibrium distributions

The result  also holds for M/M/c model stations with ci servers at the  station, with utilization requirement .

Definition

In an open network, jobs arrive from outside following a Poisson process with rate . Upon service completion at node i, a job may go to another node j with probability  or leave the network with probability .

Hence we have the overall arrival rate to node i, including both external arrivals and internal transitions:

(Since the utilisation at each node is less than 1, and we are looking at the equilibrium distribution i.e. the long-run-average behaviour, the rate of jobs transitioning from j to i is bounded by a fraction of the arrival rate at j and we ignore the service rate  in the above.)

Define , then we can solve .

All jobs leave each node also following Poisson process, and define  as the service rate of node i when there are  jobs at node i.

where  denote the  unit vector.

Theorem 
Suppose a vector of independent random variables  with each  having a probability mass function as

where . If  i.e.  is well defined, then the equilibrium distribution of the open Jackson network has the following product form:

for all .⟩

It suffices to verify equation  is satisfied. By the product form and formula (3), we have:

Substituting these into the right side of  we get:

Then use , we have:

Substituting the above into , we have:

This theorem extends the one shown above by allowing state-dependent service rate of each node.

Example 

Suppose we have a three-node Jackson network shown in the graph, the coefficients are: 

Then by the theorem, we can calculate:

 

Hence the probability that there is one job at each node is:

Since the service rate here does not depend on state, the s simply follow a geometric distribution.

Generalized Jackson network

A generalized Jackson network allows renewal arrival processes that need not be Poisson processes, and independent, identically distributed non-exponential service times. In general, this network does not have a product-form stationary distribution, so approximations are sought.

Brownian approximation
This is a two-order approximation obtained by relation between general Jackson network with homogeneous fluid network and reflected Brownian motion.

The parameters of the reflected Brownian process is specified as follows:

where the symbols are defined as:

See also
Gordon–Newell network
BCMP network
G-network
Little's law

References

Queueing theory